Performing arts in Bangladesh has a rich tradition. From ancient times, Jatra, Baulsong, Gombhira etc. presented through singing, dancing and play-acting. Jari dance, sari dance, lathi (stick) dance, khemta dance and ghatu dance are part of jari songs, sari songs, stick plays, khemta songs and ghatu songs respectively. Meyeli git, Saheli git and Hudma git reflect the hopes and desires of women. Holi git, Gazi git, Magan git and wedding songs are presented on appropriate occasions with the necessary rituals. Some songs are presented by professional singers known as gayen, bayati and gidal while others are sung by farm labourers and other workers at home and outside for relaxation and pleasure.

In the period of 1990’s performance art was introduced as a medium of art to the Bangladeshi art audience.

References

Bangladeshi culture